Oxybasis chenopodioides, (syn. Chenopodium chenopodioides) is a species of flowering plant in the family Amaranthaceae known by the common name low goosefoot.

It is native to South America, but it is known in widespread parts of Africa, Asia, Europe, and North America as an introduced species.

It grows in wet non-saline and saline soils, such as mudflats, salt marshes, and lake margins.

It is an annual herb growing erect to heights approaching 35 to 45 centimeters, or prostrate in a creeping mat. It is green to magenta in color and non-aromatic. The leaves may be several centimeters long and vary in shape from smooth-edged and oval to triangular and lobed or toothed. The inflorescence is a small, dense cluster of tiny flowers, each flower with its three-lobed calyx enclosing the developing fruit.

References

External links
Flora of North America
USDA Plants Profile - Chenopodium chenopodioides

Chenopodioideae
Flora of South America
Salt marsh plants